Jean-Jacques Dessalines (Haitian Creole: Jan-Jak Desalin; ; 20 September 1758 – 17 October 1806) was a leader of the Haitian Revolution and the first ruler of an independent Haiti under the 1805 constitution. Initially regarded as governor-general, Dessalines was later named Emperor of Haiti as Jacques I (1804–1806) by generals of the Haitian Revolution Army and ruled in that capacity until being assassinated in 1806. He has been referred to as the father of the nation of Haiti.

Dessalines was directly responsible for the country and under his rule, Haiti became the first country in the Americas to permanently abolish slavery.
Dessalines served as an officer in the French army when the colony was fending off Spanish and British incursions. Later he rose to become a commander in the revolt against France. As Toussaint Louverture's principal lieutenant, he led many successful engagements, including the Battle of Crête-à-Pierrot.

After the capture of Toussaint Louverture in 1802, who died in prison in France, Dessalines became the leader of the revolution and Général-Chef de l'Armée Indigène on 18 May 1803. He defeated a French army at the Battle of Vertières on 18 November 1803. Declaring St-Domingue independent on 29 November 1803 and Haiti an independent nation on 1 January 1804, Dessalines was chosen by a council of generals to assume the office of governor-general. 

He ordered the genocidal 1804 Haiti massacre of remaining whites, including former slave owners, in Haiti, many of whom were not willing to live in peace with the new free Haitian state, resulting in the deaths of between 3,000 and 5,000 people. He excluded surviving Polish Legionnaires, who had defected from the French legion to become allied with the enslaved Africans and the Germans who did not take part of the slave trade. He granted them full citizenship under the constitution and classified them as Noir, the new ruling ethnicity. Tensions remained with the minority of mixed-race or free people of color, who had gained some education and property during the colonial period.

In September 1804, Dessalines was proclaimed emperor by the generals of the Haitian Revolution Army. He ruled in that capacity under the Imperial Constitution 1805 until being assassinated in 1806 by opponents who were against his rule.

Early life 
Jean-Jacques Duclos was born into slavery on Cormier, a plantation near Grande-Riviere-du-Nord, Saint-Domingue. His enslaved father had adopted the surname from his owner Henri Duclos. The names of Jean-Jacques's parents, as well as their region of origin in Africa, are not known. Most slaves trafficked to Saint-Domingue were exported from west and central West Africa. He later took the surname Dessalines, after a free man of color who had purchased him. 

Working in the sugarcane fields as a laborer, Dessalines rose to the rank of commandeur, or foreman. He worked on Duclos's plantation until he was about 30 years old. Still enslaved, Jean-Jacques was bought by a man with the last name of Dessalines, an affranchi or free man of color, who assigned his own surname to Jean-Jacques. From then on he was called Jean-Jacques Dessalines. Dessalines kept this name after he gained his freedom. He worked for that master for about three years.

When the slave uprising of 1791 began, it spread across the Plaine du Nord. This was an area of very large sugar cane plantations, where the mass of enslaved Africans lived and worked. Mortality was so high that French colonial planters continued to import new slaves from Africa during the eighteenth century. Dessalines received his early military training from a woman whose name was either Victoria Montou or Akbaraya Tòya.

Dessalines became increasingly embittered toward both the whites and gens de couleur libres (the mixed-race residents of Saint-Domingue) in the years of conflict during the revolution. Haitian insurgents fought against French colonists and foreign troops in Saint-Domingue. During the years of warfare and changing rule, these included French, British, and Spanish forces. All three European nations had colonies in the Caribbean, where their control and revenues were threatened by the Haitian Revolution.

After the expulsion of French forces during the last phase of the Haitian Revolution, Dessalines ordered all whites to be killed in the new Haiti, to try to ensure the survival of the Empire as a nation. Many mulattos or free people of color were also killed. Yet, after declaring himself Governor-for-Life in 1804, Jean-Jacques Dessalines took his old master Dessalines into his house and gave him a job.

Family 
Dessalines was married to Marie-Claire Heureuse Félicité Bonheur from the city of Léogane. The wedding celebration took place in St-Marc Church and Toussaint Louverture was the witness. Marie-Claire was empress under the 1805 Constitution, and she has been credited with the concoction of the soup lendepandans or Pumpkin Independence Soup, now a UNESCO Patrimoine. She was older than her husband and died when she was 100 years old. She was referred to as the adopted wife of the Nation in a letter by Pétion after the Emperor's assassination. The couple had or adopted a total number of 16 kids including Jacques's children from the previous relationship. Innocent, one of his sons, has a fort named in his honour. Dessalines offered one of his daughters to Pétion but Pétion refused under the pretext that she was in a relationship with Chancy, one of Toussaint's nephews.

Euphémie Daguile, one of his best known concubines, was the choreographer of the Karabiyen dance known also as Jacques' favorite dance. It is still danced by Haitian families all over the country.

Dessalines had two brothers, Louis and Joseph Duclos, who also later took the surname Dessalines. Two of his brothers' sons became high-ranking members of the post-Revolutionary Haitian government.

Revolution

Ending slavery
In 1791, along with thousands of other enslaved persons, Jean-Jacques Dessalines joined the slave rebellion of the northern plains led by Jean François Papillon and Georges Biassou. This rebellion was the first action of what would become the Haitian Revolution. Dessalines became a lieutenant in Papillon's army and followed him to Santo Domingo, occupying the eastern half of the island, where he enlisted to serve Spain's military forces against the French colony of Saint-Domingue.

In that period, Dessalines met the rising military commander Toussaint Bréda (later known as Toussaint Louverture), a mature man also born into slavery. He was fighting with Spanish forces on Hispaniola. These men wanted above all to defeat slavery. In 1794, after the French declared an end to slavery as a result of the French Revolution, Toussaint Louverture switched allegiances to the French. He fought for the French Republic against both the Spanish and British, who were trying to get control of the lucrative colony of Saint-Domingue. Dessalines followed, becoming a chief lieutenant to Toussaint Louverture and rising to the rank of brigadier general by 1799.

Dessalines commanded many successful engagements, including the captures of Jacmel, Petit-Goâve, Miragoâne and Anse-à-Veau. In 1801, Dessalines quickly ended an insurrection in the north led by Louverture's nephew, General Moyse. Dessalines gained a reputation for his "take no prisoners" policy, and for burning homes and entire villages to the ground.

The rebellious slaves were able to restore most of Saint-Domingue to France, with Louverture in control. The French initially appointed him as governor-general of the colony. Louverture wanted Saint-Domingue to have more autonomy. He directed the creation of a new constitution to establish that, as well as rules for how the colony would operate under freedom. He also named himself governor-for-life, while still swearing his loyalty to France.

The French government had been through changes after the Revolution and was by then led by Napoleon Bonaparte. His wife, Josephine de Beauharnais, was from a slave-owning family. But many white and mulatto planters had been lobbying the government to reimpose slavery in Saint-Domingue. Napoleon was committed to restoring slavery in Saint-Domingue in an effort to restore the basis of the labor needed to cultivate and process the great sugar crops. Saint-Domingue generated the highest profits of any of the French colonies prior to the Revolution in 1791.

Leclerc campaign to restore slavery

The French dispatched an expeditionary force in 1802 to restore French rule to the island, an army and ships led by General Charles Leclerc. Louverture and Dessalines fought against the invading French forces, with Dessalines defeating them at the battle for which he is most famous, Crête-à-Pierrot.

During the 11 March 1802 battle, Dessalines and his 1,300 men defended a small fort against 18,000 attackers. To inspire his troops at the start of the battle, he waved a lit torch near an open powder keg and declared that he would blow the fort up should the French break through. The defenders inflicted extensive casualties on the attacking army, but after a 20-day siege, they were forced to abandon the fort due to a shortage of food and munitions. The rebels forced their way through the enemy lines and into the Cahos Mountains, with their army still largely intact.

The French soldiers under Leclerc were accompanied by mulatto troops led by Alexandre Pétion and André Rigaud, free gens de couleur from Saint-Domingue. Pétion and Rigaud, both sons of wealthy white fathers, had opposed Louverture's leadership. They had tried to establish separate independence in the South of Saint-Domingue, an area where wealthy gens de couleur were concentrated in plantations. Toussaint Louverture's forces had defeated them three years earlier.

After the Battle of Crête-à-Pierrot, Dessalines defected from his long-time ally Louverture and briefly sided with Leclerc, Pétion, and Rigaud. Several historians attribute Dessalines with being at least partially responsible for Louverture's arrest, as did Louverture's son Isaac. On 22 May 1802, after Dessalines "learned that Louverture had failed to instruct a local rebel leader to lay down his arms per the recent ceasefire agreement, he immediately wrote Leclerc to denounce Louverture’s conduct as 'extraordinary'." For this action, Dessalines and his spouse received gifts from Jean Baptiste Brunet. Louverture and a hundred members of his inner circle were arrested by Brunett on June 7, 1802 and deported to France. Louverture was imprisoned at Fort-de-Joux in Doubs, were he died on April 7, 1803 at the age of 59. 

When it became clear that the French intended to re-establish slavery on Saint-Domingue, as they had on Guadeloupe, Dessalines and Pétion switched sides again in October 1802, to oppose the French. By November 1802, Dessalines had become the leader of the alliance with the blessing of general Alexandre Pétion, the most prominent of the affranchis, or free men of color. Leclerc died of yellow fever, which also killed many of the French troops under his command. The brutal tactics of Leclerc's successor, Rochambeau, helped to unify rebel forces against the French. 

The rebels achieved a series of victories against the French, culminating in the last major battle of the revolution, the Battle of Vertières. On 18 November 1803, black and mulatto forces under Dessalines and Pétion attacked the fort of Vertières, held by Rochambeau, near Cap-Français in the north. Rochambeau and his troops surrendered the next day. On 4 December 1803, the French colonial army of Napoleon Bonaparte surrendered its last remaining territory to Dessalines's forces. This officially ended the only slave rebellion in world history which successfully resulted in establishing an independent nation.

In the process, Dessalines became arguably the most successful military commander in the struggle against Napoleonic France. Dessalines promulgated the Declaration of Independence in 1804, and declared himself emperor.

Emperor of independent Haiti
 On 1 January 1804, from the city of Gonaïves, Dessalines officially declared the former colony's independence and renamed it "Ayiti" after the indigenous Taíno name. He had served as Governor-General of Saint-Domingue since 30 November 1803. After the declaration of independence, Dessalines named himself Governor-General-for-life of Haiti and served in that role until 22 September 1804, when he was proclaimed Emperor of Haiti by the Generals of the Haitian Revolution Army. He was crowned Emperor Jacques I in a coronation ceremony on 6 October in the city of Le Cap (now Cap-Haïtien). On 20 May 1805, his government released the Imperial Constitution, naming Jean-Jacques Dessalines emperor for life with the right to name his successor.

Abolition of slavery
In declaring Haiti an independent country, Dessalines also abolished slavery in the new country. Haiti became the first country in the Americas to permanently abolish slavery. Dessalines tried to keep the sugar industry and plantations running and producing without slavery. 

After having served enslaved under white masters for 30 years, as well as having seen many atrocities, Dessalines did not trust the white French people. Many white planters and merchants, in addition to free people of color, had already fled the island as refugees, going to Cuba, the United States and France. Between February and April 1804, Dessalines ordered genocide, the 1804 Haiti massacre of remaining whites. Dessalines declared Haiti to be an all-black nation and forbade whites from owning property or land there.

Economic policies

Dessalines enforced a harsh regimen of plantation labor, described by the historian Michel-Rolph Trouillot as caporalisme agraire (agrarian militarism). As had Toussaint Louverture, Dessalines demanded that all blacks work either as soldiers to defend the nation or as laborers on the plantations, in order to raise commodity crops for export and to help sustain the nation. His forces were strict in enforcing this, to the extent that some blacks felt as if they were again enslaved.

Dessalines also believed in the tight regulation of foreign trade, which was essential for Haiti's sugar and coffee-based export economy. Like Toussaint Louverture, Dessalines encouraged merchants from Britain and the United States over those from France. For his administration, Dessalines needed literate and educated officials and managers. He placed in these positions well-educated Haitians, who were disproportionately from the light-skinned elite, as gens de couleur were most likely to have been educated.

Genocides 

1804 Haiti massacre

With victory secured and the brutal war concluded, Dessalines ordered the execution of all French people on the island. The ensuing massacre took place in 1804 during the first several months, and killings took place across the entire territory of Haiti. The death toll was estimated to be between 3,000 and 5,000 people of all ages and sexes, including the elderly and young children.

Degüello de Moca 

This massacre is part of a series of Haitian invasions of Santo Domingo and is part of the Siege of Santo Domingo (1805). Haitian historian Jean Price-Mars wrote that the troops killed white, black and mestizos inhabitants of Santo Domingo. The event is narrated by the survivor Gaspar Arredondo y Pichardo in his book Memoria de mi salida de la Isla de Santo Domingo el 28 de abril de 1805, which was written shortly after the massacre. 

The raids, carried out by 40,000 Haitian soldiers, were led by Henri Christophe and Jean-Jacques Dessalines, who were present during the action. Municipalities of Santo Domingo (Monte Plata, Cotuí, La Vega, Santiago and Moca) were reduced to ashes and troops killed Dominicans, including 40 children who were beheaded in Iglesia de Nuestra Señora del Rosario de Moca during a failed attempt to overthrow Jean-Louis Ferrand. Ferrand was later overthrown on 7 November 1808 after the defeat in the Bataille of Palo Hincado, which definitively ended the presence of any French dominion on the island.

The massacre of innocents and the burning of municipalities left a negative impression on the Dominican Republic about the intentions of Haiti, which then invaded Spanish Independent State of Haiti during the Ephemeral independence in 1822 after an irresistible invasion with the force of 10,000 Haitian troops commanded by Jean-Pierre Boyer to unify forcibly the country with Haiti. Veteran writer of Haitian history Jan Rogoziński quantified the population of Santo Domingo decreasing to 63,000, in 1819, due to attacks such as Degüello De Moca. The Dominican population was 175,000 in 1789.

Death 

Disaffected members of Dessalines's administration, including Alexandre Pétion and Henri Christophe, began a conspiracy to overthrow the Emperor. Dessalines was assassinated north of the capital city, Port-au-Prince, at Larnage (now known as Pont-Rouge), on 17 October 1806, on his way to fight the rebels. His body was dismembered and mutilated. 

His body was picked up by Marie-Sainte Dédé Bazile and buried in the Cimetière intérieur of Church Ste-Anne and a tomb was raised by Étienne Gérin's wife with the inscription: Ci-git Dessalines, mort à 48 ans (Here lays Dessalines, died at 48 years old). His body was later moved to Autel de la Patrie (Altar of the Fatherland) in Champs-de-Mars alongside Alexandre Pétion's body.

The exact circumstances of Dessalines' death are uncertain. Some historians claim that he was killed at Pétion's house at Rue l'Enterrement, after a meeting to negotiate the power and the future of the young nation. Some reports say that he was arrested and was dealt a deadly blow to the head. Another report says he was ambushed and killed at first fire.

Yet another account recalls a brutal attack on Dessalines by his men. It says he was shot at twice and hit once. Then his head was split open by a sabre's blow and he was finally stabbed three times with a dagger, with the crowd shouting "the tyrant is killed". The mob desecrated and disfigured Dessalines' remains, which were abandoned on Government Square. There was resistance to providing him with a proper burial, but Défilée (Dédée Bazile), a black woman from a humble background, took the mutilated body of the Emperor and buried it. A monument at the northern entrance of the Haitian capital marks the place where the Emperor was killed.

This assassination did not solve the tensions within the Haitian government. His murder left a power vacuum and civil war ensued. Pétion and Christophe temporarily partitioned Haiti between them, with Pétion controlling the South, where there were more gens de couleur libre.

Legacy 

Several of Dessalines's relatives also had leadership roles: 
His nephew Raymond, son of his brother Louis, became Maréchal de Camp Monsieur Raymond Dessalines, created 1st Baron de Louis Dessalines on 8 April 1811. He served as an aide-de-camp to King Henry I, privy councillor, and secretary-general of the Ministry of War between 1811 and 1820. He was a member of the Royal Chamber of Public Instruction between 1818 and 1820; he received the degree of Knight of the Order of St. Henry on 1 May 1811. He was killed by revolutionaries at Cap-Henri on 10 October 1820. 
His nephew Joseph, son of his brother of the same name, became Maréchal de Camp Monsieur Dessalines, created 1st Baron de Joseph Dessalines in 1816. He served as chamberlain to Prince Jacques-Victor Henry, the Prince Royal of Haiti, and major of the Grenadiers de la Garde. He received the degree of Knight of the Order of St. Henry on 28 October 1815.
His grandson Florvil Hyppolite was president of Haiti from 1889 to 1896.
In 1804, the city of Marchand was renamed as Dessalines in his honor. Dessalines was the first capital of the new nation before Port-au-Prince, Cap-Haitien and the first black capital of the new world. The city is on the north shore of the Artibonite River protected by a series of forts (Fin-de-Monde, Doko, Madame, Innocent and more).
For much of the 19th century, Dessalines was generally reviled for his autocratic ways. But by the beginning of the 20th century, Dessalines began to be reassessed as an icon of Haitian nationalism. The national anthem of Haiti, "La Dessalinienne", written in 1903, is named in his honor.
The Main Street in Port-au-Prince (Grande-Rue) was renamed Boulevard Jean-Jacques-Dessalines in his honor. It is the main commercial in the downtown area going from the north part to the south part.
The loa Ogou Dessalines who his venerated in the northern part and the Artibonite is served in his honor. Jacques 1st is the only Haitian leader canonized in Haitian Vodou. It is a part of the Nago family known for its militaristic rites and drumming.
Many streets, avenues, and boulevards in Haiti carry the name of Dessalines, Jean-Jacques, or Jacques 1st.
Statues in Port-au-Prince, Gonaïves, Cap-Haïtien, many other cities in Haiti, and even in former Grand-Colombia.
July 25, the date that during his rule was reserved for his birthday celebration, is St-Jacques-Majeur patron day, and a Vodou pilgrimage day up until today in St-Jacques Bassin in the Plaine-du-Nord area. 
The coat of arms of both the Kingdom of Hayti and the Second Empire Haiti features the two lions and a eagle-style bird of the coat of arms of the First Empire of Hayti.
The Haitian anthem is called la Dessaliniene or the Dessalines's song in his honor.

See also 
 Republic of Haiti
 Toussaint Louverture
 Henri Christophe
 Noirisme
 List of slaves

References

Bibliography
 Jenson, Deborah. Beyond the Slave Narrative: politics, sex, and manuscripts in the Haitian revolution. Liverpool: Liverpool University Press, 2011.

Further reading 

 Carruthers, Jacob The Irritated Genie: An Essay on the Haitian Revolution: Kemetic Institute, 1985.
  The article drawn from this reference work is alternatively entitled "January 1, 1804" and "Independent Haiti" at kreyol.com. Note also that the direct citation earlier appearing was broken, and was thus substituted.

External links 

 The Dessalines Reader. Short biography and links to many primary sources.
 "Haitian Constitution of 1805", Webster University
 Six études sur J.J. Dessalines, full text openly available for all from the Digital Library of the Caribbean
 "Jean-Jacques Dessalines by Prof. Bayyinah Bello". YouTube

|-

1758 births
1806 deaths
Haitian revolutionaries
Haitian independence activists
Monarchs of Haiti
Self-proclaimed monarchy
Haitian military leaders
Haitian people of Guinean descent
People from Nord (Haitian department)
Genocide perpetrators
Assassinated Haitian politicians
Assassinated heads of state
People murdered in Haiti
Male murder victims
19th-century murdered monarchs
19th-century monarchs in North America
18th-century Haitian people
19th-century Haitian people
Jean-Jacques
18th-century rebels
19th-century rebels
1806 murders in North America
Nobility of the Americas